Yevgeniy Klopotskiy (born 12 August 1993) is a Belarusian professional footballer.

International career
He was named in Belarus' senior squad for a 2018 FIFA World Cup qualifier against France in September 2016.

Honours
Torpedo-BelAZ Zhodino
Belarusian Cup winner: 2015–16

References

External links 
 
 
 Profile at Dinamo Brest website

1993 births
Living people
Sportspeople from Brest, Belarus
Belarusian footballers
Association football defenders
FC Dynamo Brest players
FC Torpedo-BelAZ Zhodino players
FC Vitebsk players
FC Rukh Brest players